The Lagoon of Viluni, also commonly Lagoon of Velipojë, is a lagoon of the Adriatic Sea on the Mediterranean Sea in the northern coast of Albania. Throughout history, the lagoon was a sea inlet and has been currently transformed into an estuary formed through a channel from the Buna River.

The lagoon is situated within the boundaries of the Buna River-Velipoja Protected Landscape and has been recognised as an Important Bird Area wetland of international importance by designation under the BirdLife International Convention.

See also  
 Geography of Albania
 Protected areas of Albania 
 Buna River-Velipoja Protected Landscape
 Albanian Adriatic Sea Coast
 Important Bird Areas of Albania

References 

 

Viluni
Wetlands of Albania
Geography of Shkodër County
Tourist attractions in Shkodër County
Important Bird Areas of Albania
Albanian Adriatic Sea Coast